Deucalion and Pyrrha were a couple in Greek mythology, the only male and female survivors of the Greek version of the flood myth, who repopulated Earth by throwing stones over their shoulders.

In art
Deucalion and Pyrrha (Beccafumi)
Deucalion and Pyrrha (Rubens)

See also
Adam and Eve
Deucalion (mythology)
Pyrrha (disambiguation)